Rette mich (German for rescue me) may refer to:

 "Rette mich" (Tokio Hotel song), 2005
 "Rette mich", a song by Eisbrecher from Die Hölle muss warten, 2012
 "Rette mich", a song by Nena from ?, 1984
 "Rette mich", a song by Oomph! from Ego, 2001

See also
 Rescue Me (disambiguation)
 Save Me (disambiguation)